Lahijan Rural District may refer to:
 Lahijan Rural District (Tabriz County), East Azerbaijan province
 Lahijan Rural District (Piranshahr County), West Azerbaijan province

See also
Lahijan-e Gharbi Rural District, Piranshahr County, West Azerbaijan province
Lahijan-e Sharqi Rural District, Piranshahr County, West Azerbaijan province